Lytrosis is a genus of moths in the family Geometridae first described by George Duryea Hulst in 1896.

Species
Lytrosis heitzmanorum Rindge, 1971
Lytrosis permagnaria (Packard, 1876)
Lytrosis sinuosa Rindge, 1971
Lytrosis unitaria (Herrich-Schäffer, 1854)

References

Angeronini